Sebastián Eguren Ledesma (born 8 January 1981) is a Uruguayan football manager and former player who played mainly as a defensive midfielder.

Eguren started his career with Montevideo Wanderers in 1999, and went on to play professionally in Norway, Sweden, Spain, Paraguay, Brazil, and Argentina before retiring in 2016. He earned 57 caps for Uruguay between 2001 and 2013, representing his country at the 2010 World Cup and two Copa América tournaments, winning the 2011 edition.

From 2016 he worked as a coach, mainly as an assistant to Martín Lasarte.

Playing career

Club

Early years
Born in Montevideo, Eguren started his career in native country, playing for Montevideo Wanderers FC (twice) and Club Nacional de Football. With the latter, after the 0–0 Copa Libertadores game against Club Deportivo El Nacional on 12 February 2004, he tested positive for cocaine, being suspended from football for six months. He blamed the coca tea, widely drunk in the Andean countries as a medicine which alleviates the effects of altitude, and got the shortest suspension for this kind of cases (this specific match was played at 2,800 meters above sea level, in Quito).

Eguren arrived at Hammarby IF from Norwegian club Rosenborg BK, on loan during the later part of the 2006 season and, on 5 December 2006, signed a three-year contract with the Swedish side.

Villarreal
On 30 January 2008, Eguren joined Villarreal CF of La Liga, on loan until the end of the campaign. Almost immediately cast into the starting XI, he partnered Marcos Senna in centre midfield as the Yellow Submarine obtained its best position ever in the top flight by finishing second; in May the Spaniards decided to make the move permanent, and the player penned a three-year deal.

During 2008–09, more of the same: Eguren was, alongside Senna, an everpresent fixture, and the Uruguayan scored his first goal for the club in a 3–3 home draw against Getafe CF (with the Madrid side leading 3–0 at the half-hour mark). He played 32 league matches in his first full season.

In late January 2010, as he had lost his defensive midfielder position to youth graduate Bruno, Eguren was loaned to S.S. Lazio. However, the move was cancelled days later, after the player did not pass his medical.

AIK / Sporting Gijón
Anxious for playing time in order to secure a spot on the national squad for the 2010 FIFA World Cup, Eguren signed with reigning Swedish champions AIK Fotboll on 19 February 2010. According to their director of football Björn Wesström, the agreement was technically not a loan deal as the player had no contractual obligations with Villareal until 1 July 2010 – however, he was due to return to Spain since he still had 12 months left of his contract. In early March, it was decided by the club to put the player under police protection, after he was harassed while training by fans of former side Hammarby, a fierce rival to AIK; he usually operated as a defensive midfielder previously, but manager Mikael Stahre preferred using him in an attacking midfielder or deep-lying forward role.

In late July 2010, Eguren returned to Spain but not to Villarreal, signing a three-year contract with fellow league team Sporting de Gijón. He contributed with 19 games and two goals in his second year, but the Asturians suffered relegation.

Return to South America
In July 2013, Eguren signed a one-and-a-half year deal with Brazil's Sociedade Esportiva Palmeiras. He confessed that his changing of club happened because he did not have enough playing time at his previous team Club Libertad in Paraguay, where he played second-fiddle to Pablo Guiñazú. He scored twice in 12 Campeonato Brasileiro Série B games as the team from São Paulo won the title, including the equaliser on 23 November as they defeated Ceará Sporting Club 4–1 to lift the trophy.

Having played rarely in Série A for Palmeiras in 2014, Eguren returned to Montevideo Wanderers on a one-year contract the following 27 January. Days later, he was loaned for two years to Club Atlético Colón of the Argentine Primera División. On 25 July, he went back to another former club in his hometown, Nacional.

International

Eguren made his debut for Uruguay during the 2001 Copa América, entering the pitch in the 63rd minute of a 1–0 win against Bolivia, and added a further two appearances in the competition. On 28 May 2008, after a five-year absence, he scored his first goal for the Charrúas, netting in a 2–2 friendly with Norway in Oslo.

On 6 September 2008, Eguren scored his first competitive international goal, heading Diego Forlán's corner kick for the only goal away to Colombia in 2010 FIFA World Cup qualification; he added his only other of the campaign just over a year later, to conclude a 3–1 win in the reverse fixture. He was selected for the finals in South Africa, playing once for the semi-finalists (three minutes in the group stage 0–0 draw against France). 

Always as a substitute, Eguren was used regularly in the 2011 Copa América as his nation won its 15th continental tournament. Manager Óscar Tabárez also took him to the 2013 FIFA Confederations Cup in Brazil, where he was part of a completely changed team that beat Tahiti 8–0 in the group stage en route to finishing fourth.

Coaching career
Shortly after retiring as a player, Eguren received his first coaching job in June 2016 when he was hired as assistant to Martín Lasarte at Nacional. He followed him to Al Ahly SC, where they won the Egyptian Premier League in 2018–19.

In September 2020, Eguren was hired at Atenas de San Carlos in his country's second division, having previously been the sporting director. He left the following February, to work beside Lasarte again on the Chile national team.

Lasarte and Eguren quit the Chile national team in April 2022, having failed to qualify for the World Cup in Qatar; the assistant put the blame on the advanced age of the team's star players and the failure to develop replacements for them. Days later, he was hired in his first top-flight job as a manager, with 12th-placed Montevideo City Torque.

On his Torque debut on 6 May 2022, Eguren recorded a 2–2 draw at Club Sportivo Cerrito. He resigned from the City Football Group-owned team on 20 September, having won four and lost half of 20 league matches.

Personal life
During most of his career in Europe, Eguren did not count as a foreign player, due to the fact he was married to a Swedish woman.

Besides his musical preferences, ranging from Bob Dylan to Pink Floyd, and his literary ones (he is a fan of compatriots Mario Benedetti and Eduardo Galeano), Eguren spoke openly about politics, admiring president José Mujica, with whom he shared views in favour of legalising cannabis and abortion.

Career statistics
Scores and results list Uruguay's goal tally first, score column indicates score after each Eguren goal.

|+ List of international goals scored by Sebastián Eguren
|-
| align="center"|1 || 28 May 2008 || Ullevaal, Oslo, Norway ||  || align="center"|2–1 || align="center"|2–2 || Friendly
|-
| align="center"|2 || 20 August 2008 || Sapporo Dome, Sapporo, Japan ||  || align="center"|1–0 || align="center"|3–1 || Friendly
|-
| align="center"|3 || 6 September 2008 || El Campín, Bogotá, Colombia ||  || align="center"|1–0 || align="center"|1–0 || 2010 World Cup qualification
|-
| align="center"|4 || 11 February 2009 || 11 June, Tripoli, Libya ||  || align="center"|1–0 || align="center"|3–2 || Friendly
|-
| align="center"|5 || 9 September 2009 || Centenario, Montevideo, Uruguay ||  || align="center"|3–1 || align="center"|3–1 || 2010 World Cup qualification
|-
| align="center"|6 || 8 October 2010 || Gelora Bung Karno, Jakarta, Indonesia ||  || align="center"|4–1 || align="center"|7–1 || Friendly
|-
| align="center"|7 || 10 June 2012 || Centenario, Montevideo, Uruguay ||  || align="center"|4–2 || align="center"|4–2 || 2014 World Cup qualification
|}

Honours
AIK
Svenska Supercupen: 2010

Palmeiras
Campeonato Brasileiro Série B: 2013

Uruguay
Copa América: 2011

References

External links

1981 births
Living people
Swedish people of Uruguayan descent
Naturalized citizens of Sweden
Footballers from Montevideo
Uruguayan footballers
Association football midfielders
Uruguayan Primera División players
Montevideo Wanderers F.C. players
Club Nacional de Football players
Eliteserien players
Rosenborg BK players
Allsvenskan players
Hammarby Fotboll players
AIK Fotboll players
La Liga players
Villarreal CF players
Sporting de Gijón players
Paraguayan Primera División players
Club Libertad footballers
Campeonato Brasileiro Série A players
Campeonato Brasileiro Série B players
Sociedade Esportiva Palmeiras players
Argentine Primera División players
Club Atlético Colón footballers
Uruguay international footballers
2001 Copa América players
2010 FIFA World Cup players
2011 Copa América players
2013 FIFA Confederations Cup players
Copa América-winning players
Uruguayan expatriate footballers
Expatriate footballers in Norway
Expatriate footballers in Sweden
Expatriate footballers in Spain
Expatriate footballers in Paraguay
Expatriate footballers in Brazil
Expatriate footballers in Argentina
Uruguayan expatriate sportspeople in Norway
Uruguayan expatriate sportspeople in Sweden
Uruguayan expatriate sportspeople in Spain
Uruguayan expatriate sportspeople in Paraguay
Uruguayan expatriate sportspeople in Brazil
Uruguayan expatriate sportspeople in Argentina
Uruguayan expatriate sportspeople in Egypt
Uruguayan expatriate sportspeople in Chile
Uruguayan football managers
Montevideo City Torque managers